Anchorena leads here. For the park and rest residence of the President of Uruguay, see Anchorena Presidential Estate 

Anchorena (San Luis) is a village and municipality in San Luis Province in central Argentina.

References

Populated places in San Luis Province